Siphonodentallidae is a family of scaphopods typified by Siphonodentalium and including fossil forms.

References

Scaphopods